Prognostic equation - in the context of physical (and especially geophysical) simulation, a prognostic equation predicts the value of variables for some time in the future on the basis of the values at the current or previous times. 

For instance, the well-known Navier-Stokes equations that describe the time evolution of a fluid are prognostic equations that predict the future distribution of velocities in that fluid on the basis of current fields such as the pressure gradient.

See also 
diagnostic equation

References

James R. Holton (2004) An Introduction to Dynamic Meteorology, Academic Press, International Geophysics Series Volume 88, Fourth Edition, 535 p., .

See also

http://glossary.ametsoc.org/wiki/Prognostic_equation

Atmospheric dynamics